The 2022 Saudi Super Cup Final (also known as The Berain Saudi Super Cup Final for sponsorship reasons) was the 9th edition of the Saudi Super Cup. This was the first edition of the Saudi Super Cup to feature four teams following its expansion in 2022. The final was played on 29 January 2023 at the King Fahd International Stadium, Riyadh, between Al-Ittihad and Al-Fayha.

Al-Ittihad defeated Al-Fayha 2–0 to win their first title.

Teams

Venue
The King Fahd International Stadium was announced as the venue of the final on 24 December 2022. This was the third time the King Fahd International Stadium hosted the final and the fifth time it was hosted in Saudi Arabia.

The King Fahd International Stadium was built in 1982 and was opened in 1987. The stadium was used as a venue for the 1992, 1995, and the 1997 editions of the FIFA Confederations Cup. Its current capacity is 68,752 and it is used by the Saudi Arabia national football team, Al-Hilal, Al-Shabab, and major domestic matches.

Background

As part of the running sponsorship deal between the Saudi Arabian Football Federation (SAFF) and Saudi water company Berain, the match will be officially referred to as "The Berain Saudi Super Cup".

This was Al-Ittihad's third appearance in the final. Al-Ittihad lost both of their previous finals. In 2013 they lost to Al-Fateh and in 2018 they lost to Al-Hilal. Al-Ittihad qualified by defeating Al-Nassr 3–1 in the semi-finals.

Al-Fayha made their first-ever finals appearance. Al-Fayha qualified after defeating Pro League champions Al-Hilal 1–0 in the semi-finals.

This was the first meeting between these two sides in the Saudi Super Cup and the first-ever meeting between them in a cup final. This was the 12th competitive meeting between the two with the first meeting dating back to 15 September 2014. Al-Ittihad won 6 times while Al-Fayha won 5 times. The two teams met once in the 2022–23 season with Al-Ittihad defeating Al-Fayha 3–0 at home.

Match

Details

{| width="100%"
|valign="top" width="40%"|

Statistics

See also
 2022–23 Saudi Professional League
 2022–23 King Cup

References

External links

Saudi Super Cup
2022–23 in Saudi Arabian football
Sports competitions in Saudi Arabia
January 2023 sports events in Saudi Arabia
Ittihad FC matches
Al-Fayha FC